Wang Shenzhi (862 – December 30, 925), courtesy name Xintong or Xiangqing, formally Prince Zhongyi of Min and later further posthumously honored as Emperor Taizu of Min, was the founder of Min Kingdom on the southeast coastal province of Fujian province in China during the Five Dynasties and Ten Kingdoms period of Chinese history.  He was from Gushi in modern-day Henan.

Background 
Wang Shenzhi was born in 862, during the reign of Emperor Yizong.  His fifth-generation ancestor Wang Ye served as the magistrate of Gushi County (固始, in modern Xinyang, Henan) in Guāng Prefecture, and because the people loved him, he settled his family in Gushi. Wang Shenzhi hailed from a long line of illustrious administrators and military officers feted by historians. After the family settled in Gushi, they subsequently became known for their family business.  His father's name was Wang Nin, and his mother was a Lady Dong.  He had two older brothers, Wang Chao and Wang Shengui.

Service under Wang Xu 
In 881, the bandit leader Wang Xu, along with his brother-in-law Liu Xingquan, captured Guāng Prefecture (光州, in modern Xinyang); he was subsequently commissioned the prefect of Guang Prefecture by Qin Zongquan the military governor (Jiedushi) of Fengguo Circuit (奉國, headquartered in modern Zhumadian, Henan).  Wang Xu forced the men of Guang Prefecture to join his army, and he made Wang Chao, who had previously been a government worker at the Gushi County government, his discipline officer.  Later on, however, Qin turned against the Tang imperial government and was on the cusp of claiming imperial title himself.  He ordered Wang Xu to pay taxes to him.  When Wang Xu was unable to do so, he launched an army to attack Wang.  Wang Xu, in fear, gathered 5,000 soldiers from Guang and Shou Prefectures and forced the people to cross the Yangtze River to the south.  By spring 885, Wang had continued south and captured Ting (汀州, in modern Longyan, Fujian) and Zhang (漳州, in modern Zhangzhou, Fujian) Prefectures, but was not able to hold either for long.  By the time that Wang Xu reached Zhang Prefecture, his army was running low on food.  As the terrain in Fujian Circuit (福建, headquartered in modern Fuzhou, Fujian), which Zhang Prefecture belonged to, was rugged, he ordered that the old and the weak be abandoned.  However, in violation of his order, Wang Chao and his brothers continued to take their mother Lady Dong with them.  Wang Xu rebuked them and threatened to put Lady Dong to death.  They begged for Lady Dong's life, offering to die in her stead.  Other officers also spoke on their behalf, and Wang Xu relented.

Meanwhile, by this point, Wang Xu had also become extremely paranoid, as he had been warned by a sorcerer that there was qi belonging to a king in his army, so he began to put to death anyone whom he considered to have talents surpassing his own—going as far as putting Liu Xingquan to death.  The fact that Wang was willing to put someone as close to him as Liu to death terrified the other officers.  When the army reached Na'an (南安, in modern Quanzhou, Fujian), Wang Chao persuaded Wang Xu's forward commander, who feared that he would be Wang Xu's next target, into turning against Wang Xu.  The forward commander and Wang Chao thus laid an ambush for Wang Xu and, when he was caught off-guard, arrested him.  Wang Chao initially wanted to support the forward commander to be the new leader, but the forward commander pointed out that it was Wang Chao's idea that allowed them to survive Wang Xu's cruelty, and so the army agreed to have Wang Chao become their leader.  Wang Chao subsequently took over Quan Prefecture (泉州, in modern Quanzhou, Fujian) and obtained a commission from Chen Yan the governor (觀察使, Guanchashi) of Fujian Circuit (福建, headquartered in modern Fuzhou, Fujian) as the prefect of Quan Prefecture.

Service under Wang Chao 
In 891, Chen Yan grew deathly ill.  Chen sent an order to Wang Chao, summoning him to the circuit capital Fu Prefecture, intending to entrust the matters of the circuit to him.  Before he could depart, however, Chen died, and Chen's brother-in-law Fan Hui got the soldiers at Fu Prefecture to support him as acting governor to resist Wang.  Fan, however, soon lost the support of the soldiers, and Wang Chao sent his cousin Wang Yanfu and Wang Shenzhi as Wang Yanfu's deputy to lead an army to attack Fu Prefecture.  However, they could not capture it quickly, and Fan sought aid from Dong Chang the military governor of Weisheng Circuit (威勝, headquartered in modern Shaoxing, Zhejiang), who dispatched an army to aid him.  Hearing that news, Wang Yanfu and Wang Shengui submitted a report to Wang Chao, requesting to withdraw.  Wang Chao refused.  When they requested that he come to the front to oversee the attack, he responded:

Wang Yanfu and Wang Shenzhi, fearful of the rebuke, intensified their attacks.  By summer 893, the food supply in Fu Prefecture ran out.  Fan abandoned it and fled, and the Weisheng army, still on the way, hearing that Fan had fled, returned to Weisheng.  Fan was killed by his soldiers in flight.  Wang entered Fu Prefecture and claimed the title of acting governor.  After Wang Chao was subsequently made governor of Fujian, and then the military governor (with the circuit's name upgraded from Fujian to Weiwu, Wang Shenzhi served as deputy military governor.  It was said that whenever Wang Shenzhi had faults, Wang Chao would batter him, but Wang Shenzhi would not complain.  In 897, when Wang Chao grew ill, he did not try to pass his authorities to any of his sons; rather, he entrusted the matters of the circuit to Wang Shenzhi.  After Wang Chao died around the new year 898, Wang Shenzhi offered the authorities to Wang Shengui, who was then the prefect of Quan Prefecture, but Wang Shengui declined on the account that he considered Wang Shenzhi more accomplished.  Wang Shenzhi thus claimed the title of acting military governor of Weiwu and submitted a report of what occurred to then-ruling Emperor Zhaozong, who commissioned him as acting military governor and later in the year made him full military governor.

As military governor of Weiwu 
In 900, Emperor Zhaozong bestowed the honorary chancellor designation of Tong Zhongshu Menxia Pingzhangshi on Wang Shenzhi.  He was later successively given the honorary titles of acting Sikong and acting Situ (two of the Three Excellencies).  In 902, Wang built an outer wall for Fu Prefecture.  In 904, Emperor Zhaozong created him the Prince of Langye.

In 907, the major warlord Zhu Quanzhong the military governor of Xuanwu Circuit (宣武, headquartered in modern Kaifeng, Henan) forced Emperor Zhaozong's son and successor Emperor Ai to yield the throne to him, ending Tang and starting a new Later Liang with him as its Emperor Taizu.  Wang Shenzhi recognized the new emperor, and was subsequently given the greater chancellor title of Shizhong.  In 909, Emperor Taizu created him the Prince of Min, and also gave him the chancellor title of Zhongshu Ling.

As Prince of Min

Early reign 
Meanwhile, also in 909, after Wang Shenzhi felt slighted by Zhang Zhiyuan, the emissary from Hongnong (predecessor state to Wu, then ruled by Yang Wo the Prince of Hongnong, who did not recognize the Later Liang emperor), Wang decapitated Zhang and broke off diplomatic relations with Hongnong.

As prince, Wang was said to be frugal, often wearing hemp shoes, with his mansion remaining small and unexpanded.  His criminal penalties were relaxed and tax rates were low; these policies were said to lead to both the government and the people becoming wealthy, and his realm to be calm.  He submitted yearly tributes to the Later Liang emperor by sea route, via Later Liang's Deng and Lai (萊州, both in modern Yantai, Shandong) Prefectures, but the sea route was said to be so treacherous that 40–50% casualties were common.

In 916, Wang Shenzhi gave a daughter to Qian Chuanxiang (錢傳珦, later known as Qian Yuanxiang, the son of Qian Liu, the prince of Min's neighbor to the north, Wuyue, in marriage.  Qian Chuanxiang personally went to Min for the marriage, and it was said that after the wedding, the relationship between Min and Wuyue became more friendly.  Also in 916, Wang Shenzhi began to make lead coins, and thereafter, lead coins were circulated along with the traditional copper coins.

Late reign 
In 917, Wang Shenzhi took Liu Hua, a niece of Liu Yan, the emperor of Min's southwestern neighbor Yue (which would later be known as Southern Han), whose title was Princess of Qingyuan, as the wife of his second son Wang Yanjun.  (Written historical accounts indicated that she was a daughter of Liu Yan's, but her tombstone was subsequently discovered, revealing that she was actually the daughter of Liu Yan's older brother and predecessor, Liu Yin.)

In 918, Wu, which was then ruled by Yang Wo's brother and successor Yang Longyan, launched a major attack, commanded by the general Liu Xin, on Tan Quanbo the military governor of Baisheng Circuit (百勝, headquartered in modern Ganzhou, Jiangxi), who was ruling the circuit in independence but whose nominal allegiance had vacillated between Wu and Later Liang.  Tan sought aid from Min, as well as Wuyue and Chu.  Min forces advanced to Yudu (雩都, in modern Ganzhou) to try to aid Tan, while Wuyue and Chu also sent troops.  After Liu then defeated Chu troops, Min and Wuyue forces also withdrew.  Subsequently, Liu captured Tan's capital Qian Prefecture, allowing Wu to directly take over Baisheng Circuit.

Apparently sometime after Wang Shengui's death (the date of which was not recorded in traditional histories, but appeared to be 903), Wang Shenzhi allowed Wang Shengui's son Wang Yanbin to take over governance of Quan Prefecture, and later bestowed on him the title of military governor of Pinglu Circuit (平盧, whose territory was not under Min control, being headquartered in modern Weifang, Shandong).  Wang Yanbin initially governed the prefecture well.  However, later, after he received a white deer and a purple lingzhi, he became arrogant, believing in the prophecies of the Buddhist monk Haoyuan that he would become prince in the future.  He further secretly sent emissaries to Later Liang, seeking to be a Later Liang vassal independently of Wang Shenzhi.  When Wang Shenzhi discovered this in 920, he had Haoyuan and his associates executed and removed Wang Yanbin from his posts, sending him back to his mansion.

In 922, there was an incident where Liu Yan (whose state had been renamed Han by that point and thereafter was known as Southern Han in traditional Chinese sources), believing in sorcerers who told him that he should go to Meikou (梅口, in modern Meizhou, Guangdong) to avoid a disaster.  With Meikou on the border between Southern Han and Min, the Min general Wang Yanmei, who might have been either a son of Wang Shenzhi's or Yang Shengui's, decided to launch an ambush on Liu.  However, Liu received news of the ambush and left Meikou before Min forces could attack.

In 923, Li Cunxu the Prince of Jin, whose state was a rival of Later Liang's to its north, declared himself the emperor of a new Later Tang (as Emperor Zhuangzong), and later that year captured Later Liang's capital Daliang.  The Later Liang emperor Zhu Zhen (son of Emperor Taizu) committed suicide), ending Later Liang.  Subsequently, emissaries were exchanged between Min and Later Tang, and Wang Shenzhi recognized Emperor Zhuangzong's suzerainty.

In 924, Southern Han launched an attack on Min, with Liu Yan himself commanding the troops and reaching the borders of Min's Ting and Zhang Prefectures.  A Min counterattack defeated Southern Han forces, however, and Liu Yan withdrew.

In 925, Wang Shenzhi grew ill, and he put his oldest son Wang Yanhan, then the deputy military governor of Weiwu, in charge of the affairs of the state.  (A rumor at that time was that Wang Shenzhi's illness was due to poisoning by Wang Yanhan's wife Lady Cui.)  Later in the year, Wang Shenzhi died, and Wang Yanhan took over the state, although at that time claiming only the title of acting military governor of Weiwu.

Personal information 
 Ancestors
 Wang Jian (Qin Dynasty General)
 Wang Dao (Jin Dynasty Prime Minister)
 Wang Fangqing (Tang/Zhou Dynasty Chancellor)
 Father
 Wang Nin
 Mother
 Lady Dong, posthumously honored Lady Dowager of Qin and yet later Lady Dowager Zhuanghui of Jin
 Wife
 Lady Ren Neiming, posthumously honored empress
 Major Concubines
 Lady Huang, the Lady of Lu, later honored empress dowager (honored 933), later grand empress dowager (honored 936), mother of Prince Yanjun
 Lady Chen Jinfeng, later empress to Wang Yanjun
 Children
 Wang Yanhan, later king
 Wang Yanjun, name later changed to Wang Lin, later Emperor Huizong
 Wang Yanmei
 Wang Yanbao
 Wang Yanwu (executed by Wang Jipeng 939)
 Wang Yanwang (executed by Wang Jipeng 939)
 Wang Yanxī (王延羲, note different tone than his brother), name later changed to Wang Xi, later Emperor Jingzong
 Wang Yanxǐ (王延喜, note different tone than his brother) (killed by Zhu Wenjin 944)
 Wang Yanzheng, the Prince of Fusha, later emperor
 Wang Yanzi
 Wang Yanzong
 Lady of Langye, wife of Li Min
 Daughter, wife of Zhang Siqi
 Lady of Langye, wife of Qian Yuanxiang, son of Qian Liu king of Wuyue
 Daughter, wife of Yu Tingyin
 Daughter
 Daughter
 Daughter
 Adoptive Children
 Wang Yanbing, né Zhou Yanchen (executed by Wang Yanjun 931), posthumously honored Prince Lingzhao (honored 933?) then as Prince Weisu of Wuping (honored 943)
 Wang Yanfeng, biological child of Wang Shenzhi's brother Wang Chao

Notes and references

 History of the Five Dynasties, vol. 134.
 New History of the Five Dynasties, vol. 68.
 Zizhi Tongjian, vols. 254, 259, 261, 262, 266, 267, 270, 271, 273, 274.
 Spring and Autumn Annals of the Ten Kingdoms, vol. 90.

862 births
925 deaths
Min Kingdom rulers
Tang dynasty Buddhists
Min Kingdom Buddhists
Tang dynasty jiedushi of Weiwu Circuit
Later Liang (Five Dynasties) jiedushi of Weiwu Circuit
Later Liang (Five Dynasties) Buddhists
Later Tang jiedushi of Weiwu Circuit
Politicians from Xinyang
Deified Chinese people
Chinese princes
Tang dynasty generals from Henan
Min Kingdom people born during Tang
Tang dynasty politicians from Henan
Chinese Buddhist monarchs
Founding monarchs